Roberto Cláudio das Neves Leitão (15 May 1937 – 28 November 2020) was a Brazilian martial artist in Luta Livre, or Brazilian Catch Wrestling. He was a 4th degree blackbelt in Judo, while also having 60 years in Luta Livre. He dedicated himself to flawless technique.

Biography
He held a degree in mechanical engineering.  He was university professor who continuously wrote about martial arts and grappling.  He would lead the way for Luta Livre during the 1970s.

Roberto trained a number of grapplers including Renato Sobral, Pedro Rizzo and Marco Ruas. Additionally he is said to be an instructor of José Aldo. He would also train with 1984 Greco Roman  Superheavyweight Gold medalist, Jeff Blatnick for Blatnicks run in MMA. Roberto was the coach of Renato Babalu, whom he coached to a knockout over Ilioukhine Mikhail. His son would serve as the superintendent of the Brazilian Confederation of Associated Wrestling and was an athlete at the Olympic Games at Seoul 1988 and Barcelona 1992.

He died from COVID-19 in Rio de Janeiro on 11 November 2020.

References

Brazilian martial artists
1937 births
2020 deaths
Luta Livre practitioners
Brazilian catch wrestlers
Deaths from the COVID-19 pandemic in Rio de Janeiro (state)